Eduard Popp (born 16 June 1991) is a heavyweight Greco-Roman wrestler from Germany. He won the national title in 2013 and 2014 and reached semifinals at the 2016 Summer Olympics.

In 2020, he competed in the men's 130 kg event at the 2020 Individual Wrestling World Cup held in Belgrade, Serbia. In 2021, he won one of the bronze medals in his event at the 2021 Wladyslaw Pytlasinski Cup held in Warsaw, Poland. He also competed in the men's 130 kg event at the 2020 Summer Olympics held in Tokyo, Japan.

Personal life
Popp took up Olympic Wrestling in 1997. He is married.

References

External links 
 

1991 births
Living people
Olympic wrestlers of Germany
Wrestlers at the 2016 Summer Olympics
German male sport wrestlers
Wrestlers at the 2020 Summer Olympics
20th-century German people
21st-century German people